Bhanjanagar is a town and an  urban region. It is a Notified Area Council in the Ganjam District in the state of Odisha, India. The town, earlier named as Russellkonda (Russell's Hill) after George Russell, President of then board of Revenue, was renamed later after Kavi Samrat (Poet King) Upendra Bhanja. Bhanjanagar is a planned community situated in the confluence of rivers Loharakhandi and Badanadi.

Geography
It is located on the lake created by the Bhanjanagar Dam. Bhanjanagar is a Tehsil/Block in the Ganjam District of Odisha. There are 139 villages in Bhanjanagar Block.

Nearby villages
 Agajhola
 Kaindi
 Jilundi
 Baruda
 Kullada
 Turumu
 Gallery
 Sardula
 Daha
 rajukunda palli

Demographics

According to the 2011 India census, Bhanjanagar had a population of 20,482.

Climate and regional setting
Maximum summer temperature is 37 °C; minimum winter temperature is 14 °C. The mean daily temperature varies from 33 °C to 38 °C. May is the hottest month; December is the coldest. The average annual rainfall is 1250 mm and the region receives monsoon and torrential rainfall from July to October.

Educational Institutions

Colleges
 Kabi Samrat Upendra Bhanja College
 Savitri Women's College
 Bhanja College of Computer & Management (B.C.C.M)
 Academy of Rational Philosophy for Unanimously Agreeable and Constitutional Governance

Schools
 Kendriya Vidyalaya
 PT.SR DAV Public School
 Ghumusar Residential Higher Secondary School
 Upendra Bhanja High School
 Dina Bandhu Government Girls' High School
 Sribatsa High School
 P.S.B. School, RC Road
 Saraswati Sishu Vidya Mandira (Dihapadhala)
 Swami Vivekananda Public School
 Government Middle English Medium School (Bari School)
 St. Xavier's English Medium High School
 St. Anne's English Medium School
 Sri Satya Sai Vidya Vihar
 Kanhu Rauta High School (Lalsing)
 Dibya Shakti English Medium School (Niladri Bihar)
 Govt. Somanath Practicing High School

Training Institutes
 K.S.U.B Teacher's Training College (B.Ed. College)
 Govt. Elementary Teacher Education Institute (G.E.T.E.I) - C.T. Training School
 Kalam Institute of Computer Studies (Autonomous body)
 BDPS Software Training (Estd. 1997), High School Square
 ITCT Computer Institute (Khalasi Sahi)
 Bhanjanagar Computer Academy
 MCC Academy
 OEIT Computer Institute, Landei sahi
 Adyaa Classes, Landei Sahi

Industries
Bhanjanagar has fertile lands, and a number of rice paddy processing units, or rice mills.

Culture
The Thakurani Yatra, Ratha Yatra and Danda Jatra festivals draw crowds to Bhanjanagar.

Apart from this, Dola Purnima, Durga Puja(Dussehra), Kumar Purnima, Pana Sankranti, Nurshingha Chaturthi, Ram Navami, Janmashtami, Danda Yatra, Ganesh Puja and Saraswati Puja are also celebrated. People with brotherhood celebrating all the festivals.

Attractions and sites
The water of this reservoir irrigates many acres of land in Ghumusar (Bhanjanagar), Berhampur and Chhatrapur sub-divisions, and also supplies drinking water to Bhanjanagar and Berhampur city. Construction was completed in the year 1894. The panoramic view of the reservoir is a popular tourist attraction. To increase further tourism, a huge park, named "Biju Patnaik Children's Park", in a natural surrounding with many Playing Instruments, a toy train, Science Park, Model Zoo, Road Train and swings for kids, boating facility, Family Train, 3D-Hall, Video Games, Aquarium, "Bhanja Doli", "Kalinga Boita" and last but not the least, an extraordinary and unique musical fountain were constructed for amusement. In April 2013, the tallest Shiva statue of Odisha (7th/8th-tallest Shiva statue in the world) was built at Beleswar Hill Top, located close to the water reservoir.

Maa Soradevi Temple, College Road
Shirdi Sai Temple, Bypass Road
Kulada Vagdevi Temple, Kulada
Jagannath Swami Temple, Kulada
Vancheshwar Temple, Dhudhua
The Divine Life Society, Bhanjangar Branch, Main Road, Bhanjanagar
Gandhi Kailash Hill
Vana Vihara
Daha 
Deer Park
Bhanja Sahitya Parishada

Transport
 By Road: Bhanjanagar is connected with NH-157, SH-37 and SH-21 which connect Bhanjanagar to other cities and towns of Odisha.
 By Rail: Brahmapur railway station is the nearest railway halt.
 By Air: Biju Patnaik International Airport is about 170 km from the town.

References

Cities and towns in Ganjam district